Bertrand Reuzeau (born 1 April 1966) is a retired French football midfielder.

References

1966 births
Living people
French footballers
Stade Lavallois players
Lille OSC players
Montpellier HSC players
FC Sochaux-Montbéliard players
Association football midfielders
Ligue 1 players
Ligue 2 players
France under-21 international footballers